Sidney de Jong (born 14 April 1979) is a Dutch former baseball player.

De Jong represented the Netherlands at the 2004 Summer Olympics in Athens where he and his team finished sixth.  He also represented the Dutch at the 2009 World Baseball Classic in San Juan, Puerto Rico and in Miami, Florida.
Following the 2011 Baseball World Cup he was knighted, along with teammate Didi Gregorius and technical director Robert Eenhoorn.

External links

De Jong at the Dutch Olympic Archive

1979 births
Living people
2006 World Baseball Classic players
2009 World Baseball Classic players
Baseball players at the 2004 Summer Olympics
Baseball players at the 2008 Summer Olympics
Olympic baseball players of the Netherlands
Dutch baseball players
Sportspeople from Amsterdam
Mr. Cocker HCAW players
L&D Amsterdam Pirates players